Henry Mitchell may refer to:

Law and politics
 Henry Mitchell (Irish judge) (c. 1320–1384), Irish judge of the fourteenth century
 Henry Mitchell (New York politician) (1784–1856), American politician
 Henry L. Mitchell (1831–1903), 16th Governor of Florida

Sportspeople
 Henry Mitchell (footballer) (1874–1943), Australian rules footballer
 Kent Mitchell (Henry Kent Mitchell II, born 1939), American rower and Olympic medalist

Other uses

 Henry Mitchell (brewer) (1837–1913), of Mitchells & Butlers Brewery
 His son, Henry Mitchell Junior, known as Harry Mitchell
 Henry Mitchell (engraver) (1835–?), American engraver
 Henry Mitchell (mill owner) (1824–1898), British woollen mill owner
 Henry Mitchell (oceanographer) (1830–1902), American oceanographer, namesake of USC&GS Mitchell
 H. Lane Mitchell (Henry Lane Mitchell, 1895–1978), Public works commissioner in Shreveport, Louisiana, 1934 to 1968

Fictional characters
 Henry Mitchell, a fictional character from the television series Charmed; see List of Charmed characters
 Henry Mitchell, a fictional character, Dennis's father in the U.S. comic strip Dennis the Menace
 Henry Ramsay (Neighbours), also known as Henry Mitchell, fictional character in the Australian soap opera Neighbours

See also
 Mitchell Henry (1826–1910), English financier and MP for Galway County
 Harry Mitchell (disambiguation)